Mauriac may refer to:

Medicine
 Mauriac syndrome, a complication of type 1 diabetes

Places
 Mauriac, Cantal, in the Cantal département of France
 Mauriac, Gironde, in the Gironde département of France

People with the surname
 Claude Mauriac (1914–1996), French writer and journalist, son of François
 François Mauriac (1885–1970), French writer, Nobel Prize in Literature in 1952